Troublesome is an unincorporated community in Grand County, in the U.S. state of Colorado.

History
A post office called Troublesome was established in 1878, and remained in operation until 1935. The community takes its name from nearby Troublesome Creek.

On October 1st, 2020 the second largest fire in Colorado history took place in East Troublesome. The fire burned more than 120,000 acres in less than a day, making it the most rapid-fire expansion recorded in state history.

See also

References

External links

Unincorporated communities in Grand County, Colorado
Unincorporated communities in Colorado